Boulogne station may refer to:

Boulogne – Jean Jaurès (Paris Métro), a rapid transit station in Boulogne-Billancourt, Île-de-France, France
Boulogne-Maritime station, a former railway station and port in Boulogne-sur-Mer, France
Boulogne – Pont de Saint-Cloud (Paris Métro), a rapid transit station in Boulogne-Billancourt, Île-de-France, France
Boulogne-Tintelleries station, a railway station in the historic centre of Boulogne-sur-Mer, Pas-de-Calais, France
Boulogne-Ville station, a railway station in Boulogne-sur-Mer, Pas-de-Calais, France

See also
Avenue Foch station, a commuter rail station in Paris, France, originally called Avenue du Bois de Boulogne
Bois-de-Boulogne station, a commuter rail station in Montreal, Quebec, Canada